Nikolajević is a Serbian surname, a patronymic derived from the male given name Nikolaj. It may refer to:

Svetomir Nikolajević
Petar Nikolajević Moler

See also
Nikolić

Serbian surnames
Patronymic surnames
Surnames from given names